P. pacificus may refer to:

 Pristionchus pacificus, a free-living nematode
 Polistes pacificus, a neotropical paper wasp
 Palaemon pacificus, a species of shrimp
 Parazen pacificus, an Atlantic zeiform fish
 Paraconcavus pacificus, an acorn barnacle
 Pelagihabitans pacificus a marine bacterium
 Philanthus pacificus, another species of New World wasp
 Profundiconus pacificus, a species of sea snail
 Peregocetus pacificus, an early form of whale discovered in Peru
 Paraletharchus pacificus, the sailfin eel
 Porribius pacificus, the New Zealand bat flea